Members of the Legislative Assembly of Samoa were elected on 26 April 1996. The 49 members consisted of 47 Samoans elected in one or two-member constituency and two 'individual voters' elected from a nationwide constituency.

List of members

References

 1996